Koprzywnica  is a town in Sandomierz County, Świętokrzyskie Voivodeship, Poland, with 2,546 inhabitants (2004). Koprzywnica lies on the Koprzywianka river, in Lesser Poland. It is one of the oldest urban centers of the province, located along the Tarnobrzeg Route of historic Lesser Polish Way of St. James, and on the National Road Nr. 79, which goes from Kraków to Sandomierz.

History
The settlement of Koprzywnica existed already at the beginning of the 12th century, and at that time was called Pokrzywnica. In 1185, Prince Casimir II the Just brought here the Cistercians, and in the same year, local nobleman Mikołaj Bogoria Skotnicki of Bogorya coat of arms presented Koprzywnica to the monks, together with several villages in the area. By order of the Duke of Sandomierz, Bolesław V the Chaste, Koprzywnica was granted town rights (see Magdeburg Rights), on December 8, 1268. Due to the presence of the Cistercians, Koprzywnica prospered, and from the 14th to the 17th century it was among medium-sized towns of Lesser Poland. In 1606, it was one of the centers of a rokosz (armed rebellion) of the nobility against King Zygmunt III Waza, organized by Mikołaj Zebrzydowski. In 1655–1660 Koprzywnica was destroyed during the Swedish invasion of Poland. The town never recovered from the losses, and in 1869 Russian authorities of Congress Poland reduced it to the status of a village. Koprzywnica became a town again on January 1, 2001.

The Holocaust
Koprzywnica's ghetto was liquidated by German occupiers on 31 October 1942, when 1,800 Jews from the ghetto were transported by a Holocaust train to the Treblinka extermination camp and gassed to death, including expellees from Radom and Vienna.

Points of interest
Among notable points of interest in Koprzywnica are: 
 Cistercian church of St. Florian (13th century, destroyed in the Mongol invasion of Poland in 1241, rebuilt and remodeled in the 15th and 18th centuries)
 Eastern wing of the former Cistercian monastery (13th century)
 Market square with St. Mary of Rosary church (1470)

References 

 History of Koprzywnica at virtual shtetl

Cities and towns in Świętokrzyskie Voivodeship
Sandomierz County
Sandomierz Voivodeship
Radom Governorate
Kielce Voivodeship (1919–1939)
Holocaust locations in Poland